French Equatorial Africa, or the AEF, was the federation of French colonial possessions in Equatorial Africa, extending northwards from the Congo River into the Sahel, and comprising what are today the countries of Chad, the Central African Republic, the Republic of the Congo, and Gabon.

History
Established in 1910, the Federation contained four (later five)  colonial possessions: French Gabon, French Congo, Ubangi-Shari and French Chad. The Governor-General was based in Brazzaville with deputies in each territory.

In 1911, France ceded parts of the territory to German Kamerun as a result of the Agadir Crisis. The territory was returned after Germany's defeat in World War I, while most of Cameroon proper became a French League of Nations mandate not integrated into the AEF.

French Equatorial Africa, especially the region of Ubangi-Shari, had a similar concession system as the Congo Free State and similar atrocities were also committed there. Writer André Gide traveled to Ubangi-Shari and was told by inhabitants about atrocities including mutilations, dismemberments, executions, the burning of children, and villagers being forcefully bound to large beams and made to walk until dropping from exhaustion and thirst. The book Travels to Congo by Gide, published in 1927, describes the horrors of the concession companies in French Equatorial Africa. The book had an important impact on the anti-colonialist movement in France. The number of victims under the French concession system in Ubangi-Shari and other parts of French Equatorial Africa remains unknown. Adam Hochschild estimates a population decrease of half in the French Congo and Gabon, similar to his estimate of the population decline in the Congo Free State.

During the late 1920s and early 1930s an anti-colonial movement Société Amicale des Originaires de l'A.E.F. was established by André Matsoua, seeking French citizenship for the territory's inhabitants.

During World War II, the federation rallied to the Free French Forces under Félix Éboué in August 1940, except for Gabon which was Vichy French until 12 November 1940, when the Vichy administration surrendered to invading Free French; the federation became the strategic centre of Free French activities in Africa.

Under the Fourth Republic (1946–58), the federation was represented in the French parliament. When the territories voted in the September 1958 referendum to become autonomous within the French Community, the federation was dissolved. In 1959 the new republics formed an interim association called the Union of Central African Republics, before becoming fully independent in August 1960.

Administration
French Equatorial Africa began with the concept of association, which was implemented through treaties promising French protection by the Italian-French explorer Pierre Savorgnan de Brazza during the mid-1800s, who convinced indigenous communities to cooperate with the French in exchange for greater trade opportunities. This association eventually led to French indirect rule in the region. However, France's attempts at indirect rule faced consistent resistance from local leaders.

The AEF was perceived by France as an unstable colony. Therefore, France granted private companies contracts for the exploitation of natural resources like ivory and rubber, rather than sustainable investment. Private companies implemented heavy taxation with little to no pay and cruel treatment towards workers and the local communities.

In 1908 French Equatorial Africa was divided into four colonies in hopes of strengthening French authority within the region. Until 1934, French Equatorial Africa was a federation of French colonies like French West Africa. That year, however, the AEF became a unitary entity, its constituent colonies becoming known as regions, and later became known as territories in 1937. There was a single budget for the unified colony; prior to unification, each member had had its own finances. 

As of 1942, the AEF was administered by a governor-general, who had "the supreme direction of all services, both civil and military." However, the difference in numbers between administrators and the local populace made it difficult for the French to exercise power outside of their headquarters without voluntary or involuntary indigenous cooperation. Additionally, the governor-general's power was limited in practice by France's centralizing colonial policy. "Most important legislation is enacted in Paris," wrote the authors of the 1942 British naval intelligence handbook for the colony, "whilst the governor-general fills in minor details and penalties." The governor-general was assisted by a consultative council of administration (Conseil d'Administration) composed of important local officials and some members, both African and European, elected indirectly. All major administration positions were appointed by French government and were not accountable to officials elected by the African people. Additionally, France held complete control over diplomacy, defense, and politics.

Under the unified colony, three of the constituent territories, Chad, Gabon, and Ubangi-Shari, were administered by a governor, while Moyen-Congo was under the purview of the governor-general. Each had a council of local interests (Conseil des Interêts Locaux) similar to the council of administration. Locally, the territories were subdivided into départments and subdivisions overseen by appointed officials. The only municipalities were the capitals of the territories, which were classified as communes mixtes as opposed to Senegal's communes de plein exercise, which had democratically elected councils. Although these municipalities possessed certain powers of local self-government, their mayors and councils---which included African representatives---were appointed.

Geography
Accounting for a little less than an eighth of Africa, across modern day Central African Republic, Republic of Chad, Republic of the Congo, Republic of Gabon, and most of Cameroon, the greater part of French Equatorial Africa extended over a granite plateau, framed by the Tibesti, Ouadaï, and Fertit massifs to the northeast, Darfur to the east and the Crystal mountains and Mayombe in the southwest. Two basins occupied the central and southern parts of the territory: the basin of Chad, a former inland sea of which Lake Chad is a remnant, and the basin of Congo, traversed by the river of the same name and its main tributaries (Oubangui River, Sangha River, and Alima River). A coastal plain stretched from mainland Spanish Guinea (now Equatorial Guinea) to the Congo River. The highest point in French Equatorial Africa was Mount Emi Koussi (3,415 meters) in Tibesti.

Due to the very size of the territory, the climate varied extremely from one point to another, going from a particularly arid Saharan climate in the north to a humid tropical climate in the southern part. The vegetation was affected by these differences: in the north, the virtual absence of rain made it nearly impossible for vegetation to develop, apart from a few thorny shrubs; in the center lay the domain of the savannahs, where millet, peanuts and cassava were grown; finally to the south were the humid tropical forests, from which various species such as ebony and okoumé were taken. In the coastal regions, vanilla, cocoa and coffee trees were grown. 

French Equatorial Africa was bounded by British Nigeria, French West Africa, Italian Libya, Anglo-Egyptian Sudan and the Belgian Congo. To the west, it bordered the Atlantic Ocean.

Territories:
French Chad
Ubangi-Shari
French Congo
French Gabon

Postage stamps

The postal administrations of the four territories were separate until 1936, each issuing its own stamps. In that year, stamps of Gabon and Middle Congo were overprinted AFRIQUE / ÉQUATORIALE / FRANÇAISE. A definitive series for the colony followed in 1937, featuring local scenes and key French figures in the formation of the colony, with various color and value changes each year through 1940.

The 1937 series was overprinted AFRIQUE FRANÇAISE / LIBRE or just LIBRE in 1940 by the Free French, and in 1941 they issued a series depicting a phoenix rising from the flames.

A new definitive series, featuring local scenery and people, was issued in 1946, and another twenty-odd stamps came out during the 1950s, with the last being the omnibus Human Rights issue on 10 December 1958.

See also
 List of colonial heads of French Equatorial Africa
 French colonial empire
 Free French Africa
 French West Africa
 List of French possessions and colonies
 French colonial flags
 French North Africa
 Economic Community of Central African States
 Central African CFA franc

References

Bibliography

External links

 
Equatorial Africa
Former colonies in Africa
Equatorial Africa, French
History of Central Africa
French Cameroon
20th century in Chad
Ubangi-Shari
20th century in Gabon
20th century in the Republic of the Congo
France–Gabon relations
Chad–France relations
Central African Republic–France relations
France–Republic of the Congo relations
Cameroon–France relations
States and territories established in 1910
Former countries in Africa
1910 establishments in French Equatorial Africa
1958 disestablishments in French Equatorial Africa